The women's water polo tournament at the 2019 World Aquatics Championships was held from 14 to 26 July.

The United States captured their sixth overall title after defeating Spain in the final, while Australia won against Hungary to win the bronze medal.

Participating teams

Africa

Americas

Asia

Europe

Oceania

Draw
The draw was held on 7 April 2019.

Seeding
The seedings were announced on 6 February 2019.

Preliminary round
All times are local (UTC+9).

Group A

Group B

Group C

Group D

Knockout stage

Bracket
Championship bracket

5th place bracket

9th place bracket

13th place bracket

Playoffs

Quarterfinals

13th–16th place semifinals

9th–12th place semifinals

5th–8th place semifinals

Semifinals

15th place game

13th place game

Eleventh place game

Ninth place game

Seventh place game

Fifth place game

Bronze Medal match

Gold Medal match

Final standing

Team roster 
Amanda Longan, Maddie Musselman, Melissa Seidemann, Rachel Fattal, Paige Hauschild, Maggie Steffens (C), Stephania Haralabidis, Kiley Neushul, Aria Fischer, Kaleigh Gilchrist, Makenzie Fischer, Alys Williams, Ashleigh Johnson. Head coach: Adam Krikorian.

Awards and statistics

Top goalscorers

Awards
The awards and all-star team were announced on 26 July 2019.

Most Valuable Player
 Roser Tarragó

Most Valuable Goalkeeper
 Laura Ester

Highest Goalscorer
 Rita Keszthelyi – 24 goals

Media All-Star Team
 Laura Ester – Goalkeeper
 Aria Fischer – Centre forward
 Stephania Haralabidis
 Rita Keszthelyi
 Maud Megens
 Alena Serzhantova
 Roser Tarragó

References

External links
Official website
Records and statistics (reports by Omega)

2019
Women